Suzanne Décarie is a Canadian politician, who has been a Montreal City Councillor for the Pointe-aux-Trembles ward in the borough of Rivière-des-Prairies–Pointe-aux-Trembles since 2009.

She was first elected to city council in 2009 as a member of the Vision Montréal party, following a stint as the same district's representative on the borough council. She briefly served as interim borough mayor of Rivière-des-Prairies–Pointe-aux-Trembles in 2010, between the resignation of Joe Magri and the election of Chantal Rouleau.

However, she left the Vision Montréal caucus to sit as an independent councillor on May 30, 2013, indicating that she will run for reelection in the 2013 election as part of Équipe Denis Coderre.

References

External links
Suzanne Décarie

Montreal city councillors
Women in Quebec politics
Women municipal councillors in Canada
Living people
People from Rivière-des-Prairies–Pointe-aux-Trembles
21st-century Canadian politicians
21st-century Canadian women politicians
Year of birth missing (living people)